The Greater Mekong Sub-region Academic and Research Network (GMSARN) is a network of academic and research institutions in a Greater Mekong sub-region.

Its mission is to carry out activities in human resources development, joint research, and dissemination of information and intellectual assets generated in the region. With an emphasis to complementary linkages between technological and socio-economic development issues.

Partners 

 Institute of Technology of Cambodia
 Royal University of Phnom Penh

 Kunming University of Science and Technology
 Guangxi University
 Yunnan University

 National University of Laos

 Yangon Technological University

 Asian Institute of Technology
 Khon Kaen University
 Thammasat University

 Hanoi University of Science and Technology
 Ho Chi Minh City University of Technology

Associate members 

 Nakhon Phanom University
 Ubon Rajathanee University

 Mekong River Commission

See also
 The Journal of GMS Development Studies
 GMSARN INTERNATIONAL JOURNAL

External links
Official website

References

Greater Mekong Subregion
Education in Southeast Asia
Educational organizations based in Asia
Research institutes in Asia
Economy of Southeast Asia